Days Gone By is the debut LP album by the Canadian electronic music duo Bob Moses, released on September 18, 2015 via the labels Domino Recording Company.

Critical reception 
Andrew Ryce wrote in a review for the Resident Advisor magazine that "few acts in recent memory have bridged the gap between rock and dance music like Bob Moses."

Track listing

References

2015 debut albums